Kathleen K. Drew (born 1951 or 1952) is an American politician who served as a member of the Washington State Senate, representing the 5th district from 1993 to 1997. A member of the Democratic Party, she was defeated by Republican Dino Rossi in her 1996 reelection bid and later ran for Washington Secretary of State in 2012 and was defeated by moderate Republican Kim Wyman.

References

Year of birth missing (living people)
Living people
Democratic Party Washington (state) state senators
20th-century American politicians